Kali Raat is a 1977 Bollywood film directed by Shiriram Bohra. The film stars Vinod Mehra and Yogeeta Bali.

Soundtrack
The music is composed by Laxmikant–Pyarelal, while the songs are written by Majrooh Sultanpuri.

External links
 

1977 films
1970s Hindi-language films
Films scored by Laxmikant–Pyarelal